Pittsburg Township may refer to:

 Pittsburg Township, Johnson County, Arkansas, in Johnson County, Arkansas
 Pittsburg Township, Mitchell County, Kansas

Township name disambiguation pages